Agromyces atrinae is a Gram-positive, aerobic and non-motile bacterium from the genus of Agromyces which has been isolated from fermented seafood from Korea.

References 

Microbacteriaceae
Bacteria described in 2010